Moise Mbiye is a Congolese gospel singer-songwriter and pastor in Kinshasa, Democratic Republic of the Congo.

Musical career 
At age 10, Mbiye joined a singing group called "Group of Junior Worship." Throughout early adolescence, he continued exploring music, eventually learning piano and guitar at 13.

At age 17, Mbiye joined the group Les Etoiles de Praise, as a singer and keyboardist. After the success of the group's first album, Litatoli, Mbiye became the band leader.

Mbiye released his first solo single, "Chantant Alleluia".  It was composed by his father and featured his sister Lydie Mbiye and Mike Kalambay. Mbiye later rejuvenated Les Etoiles de Praise. which recorded the album Plus que cristal.

A year after that second album, Mbiye left the group and released his first album, Influence.  Two years later, he released his second album Le Coeur de L'agneau which was also successful.

Pastor 
After releasing Coeur de L'agneau, Mbiye decided to leave his music career and become a Christian pastor.  After receiving his baccalaureate, Mbiye deepened his musical knowledge by integrating the INA, but beyond his expectations.

Mbiye started attending a school of theology and became a preacher at Bethel congregation Bethel meeting at Pastor Ignas Ndumbi. In time Mbiye became the youth coordinator (president) of the Bethel JMC missionary youth for Christ.

Mbiye graduated with distinction from theology school, but still remained a preacher. Later he became a preacher at the Bethel Central Assembly Church.

Discography

Albums 
2007: Influence, vol. 1 (Influence, v. 1)
2009:  Le coeur de l'agneau (La réserve de l'éternel) (The Heart of the Lamb (The reserve of the eternal))
2012: Champion (La reserve de l'éternel) (Champion (The reserve of the eternal))
2013: Na Ndimi (Acoustic remix)
2014: Totale Adoration 2 (Cité Béthel)
2016: Héros (Heros)
2018: La Réserve De L'eternel (The Reserve of the Eternal)

Singles 
Nabimi Molongi
Tango Naye(in Hiss'  times)
Molimo(holy spirit)
Natiela Yo Motemai put my heart to u)
Oza Mosantu (feat. Bebe Souza)
Pona Yesu(for Jesus)
Héros (Heros)
Eben Ezer(blessing are here)
Bilaka
Losambo
Yesu Azali Awa(Jesus is here)
Oui Je Le Vois (Yes, I see It)
Intouchable (Untouchable)
Zala Na Ngai(be with me)
Nandimi(I believe)
Nous Deux (We Two)
Influence (Influence)
Alembi Yo Te(you are not tiered)

References 

Living people
People from Kinshasa
21st-century Democratic Republic of the Congo male singers
Democratic Republic of the Congo Protestants
Democratic Republic of the Congo gospel singers
Democratic Republic of the Congo songwriters
Year of birth missing (living people)